

423001–423100 

|-id=097
| 423097 Richardjarrell ||  || Richard Adrian Jarrell (1946–2013), a Canadian historian of science and technology || 
|}

423101–423200 

|-bgcolor=#f2f2f2
| colspan=4 align=center | 
|}

423201–423300 

|-id=205
| 423205 Echezeaux ||  || The village of Flagey-Echezeaux, situated between Beaune and Dijon, France || 
|}

423301–423400 

|-id=380
| 423380 Juhászárpád ||  || Árpád Juhász (born 1935) is a Hungarian geologist, one of the most significant figures in the spreading of scientific knowledge in Hungary. During his career, he made a number of geographical films and participated as an expert in geographical-themed popular science series on TV. || 
|}

423401–423500 

|-id=433
| 423433 Harsányi ||  || John Harsanyi (János Harsányi; 1920–2000) was a Hungarian-American Nobel Prize laureate economist. He is best known for his contributions to the study of game theory and its application to economics. For his work, he was a co-recipient along with John Nash and Reinhard Selten of the 1994 Nobel Memorial Prize in Economic Sciences. || 
|}

423501–423600 

|-bgcolor=#f2f2f2
| colspan=4 align=center | 
|}

423601–423700 

|-bgcolor=#f2f2f2
| colspan=4 align=center | 
|}

423701–423800 

|-bgcolor=#f2f2f2
| colspan=4 align=center | 
|}

423801–423900 

|-bgcolor=#f2f2f2
| colspan=4 align=center | 
|}

423901–424000 

|-bgcolor=#f2f2f2
| colspan=4 align=center | 
|}

References 

423001-424000